Keim Peak is a noteworthy pointed rock peak,  high, on the southern spur of Pomerantz Tableland, in the Usarp Mountains of Antarctica. It was mapped by the United States Geological Survey from surveys and U.S. Navy aerial photographs, 1960–62, anad was named by the Advisory Committee on Antarctic Names for Mike B. Keim, U.S. Navy, an aerial photographer on flights by Squadron VX-6 in Victoria Land in 1962–63, returning to Antarctica in 1963–64.

References

Mountains of Oates Land